Stelios Longras (born 17 August 1976, in Nicosia, Cyprus) is a Cypriot football defender who last played for Olympiakos Nicosia after serving as captain for APEP Pitsilia for many years.

External links
Profile at Playmaker Stats

Olympiakos Nicosia players
Cypriot footballers
Association football defenders
Living people
1976 births
APEP FC players